Mark A. Wallace (born April 24, 1953) is an American businessman who has been president and chief executive officer of Texas Children's Hospital since 1989. He is the longest-serving CEO in the Texas Medical Center.

Biography 
Wallace attended college at Oklahoma Baptist University and Washington University. Wallace was a senior vice president at Houston Methodist Hospital from 1983 to 1989. He served two terms as president of the ACHE Houston chapter.  Wallace served as Chairman of the Texas Hospital Association in 1999.

In 2017, an outpatient building located at the intersection of Fannin Street and Holcombe Boulevard was designated the Mark A. Wallace Tower.

An illustrated children's book titled The Magic Book of Maxims shares the "Ten Maxims of Leadership" that Wallace developed during his career.

Awards 
Medical Bridges One People, One World Gala Honoree, 2020
Baylor College of Medicine Honorary Doctorate of Humanities, 2015
Houston Business Journal's Best Nonprofit CEO and Best Executive of the Year, 2015
The Robin Bush Award, 2011
Houston Leadership Award from the Jewish Institute for National Security Affairs, 2009
Earl M. Collier Award for Distinguished Healthcare Administration, 2005
American College of Healthcare Executives Robert S. Hudgens Memorial Award, 1992
Oklahoma Baptist University's Alumni Achievement Award, 1992

References

American businesspeople
Living people
1953 births